Wellsville is a city in Cache County, Utah, United States. The population was 3,432 at the 2010 census, with an estimated population of 3,849 in 2018. It is included in the Logan, Utah-Idaho Metropolitan Statistical Area.

Wellsville was laid out in 1856, and named after Daniel H. Wells, a Mormon leader.

Geography
Wellsville is on the Eastern side of the Wellsville Mountains.

Climate
Large seasonal temperature differences typify this climatic region, with warm to hot (and often humid) summers and cold (sometimes severely cold) winters. According to the Köppen Climate Classification system, Wellsville has a humid continental climate, abbreviated "Dfb" on climate maps.

Demographics

As of the census of 2000, there were 2,729 people, 778 households, and 686 families residing in the city. The racial makeup of the city was 97.29% White, 0.40% Native American, 0.15% Asian, 0.15% Pacific Islander, 1.73% from other races, and 0.29% from two or more races. Hispanic or Latino of any race were 2.79% of the population.

There were 778 households, out of which 55.3% had children under 18 living with them, 79.8% were married couples living together, 5.4% had a female householder with no husband present, and 11.8% were non-families. 9.8% of all households were made up of individuals, and 5.7% had someone living alone who was 65 years of age or older. The average household size was 3.51, and the average family size was 3.79.

The city's population was spread out, with 38.3% under 18, 10.2% from 18 to 24, 26.9% from 25 to 44, 16.9% from 45 to 64, and 7.7% who were 65 years of age or older. The median age was 26 years. For every 100 females, there were 104.0 males. For every 100 females aged 18 and over, there were 101.4 males.

The median income for a household in the city was $49,115, and the median income for a family was $51,023. Males had a median income of $37,244 versus $21,750 for females. The per capita income for the city was $16,171. About 5.8% of families and 6.4% of the population were below the poverty line, including 8.1% of those under age 18 and 8.8% of those aged 65 or over.

Notable person
 Earl W. Bascom, rodeo cowboy, international artist, inventor, Utah Sports Hall of Fame inductee, worked for the McBride Ranch of Wellsville in 1934

References

External links
City of Wellsville official website

Cities in Cache County, Utah
Cities in Utah
Logan metropolitan area
Populated places established in 1856
1856 establishments in Utah Territory